Henry Harvey Vivian (20 April 1868 – 30 May 1930) was an English trade unionist, and Liberal Party politician and campaigner for industrial democracy and co-partnership, especially noted for his work in co-partnership housing.

Biography
Vivian was born in Cornwood, Devon, not far from Dartmoor, the son of William Henry Vivian, a carpenter. He was educated at the local Church of England or 'national' school and following a period as an apprentice to a local carpenter, he moved to London for work. In August 1894, he married Harriett Helen Sturgeon, the daughter of an Inland Revenue supervisor. Together with their daughter they lived in Burgoyne Road, Harringay.

Vivian's spiritual beliefs appear to have been very much in line with his political ones. John Burns, on opening a new recreation ground at Brentham in June 1908, described him as a practical mystic

Career

Trade unionist
Like his father, Vivian was a carpenter by trade and became an active trade union organiser. He was for a time President of the Pimlico Society of Carpenters and Joiners.

Co-partnership
He was a strong believer in the ideals of the cooperative movement being a member of the Central Board of the Cooperative Congress for the London region and of co-partnership in industry and society which he believed made industrial harmony more likely as employees gained a direct stake in the ownership and success (through profit-sharing) of the companies for which they worked. He was a leader in the co-partnership housing movement, a campaigning secretary of the Labour Co-partnership Association, chairman of the Co-partnership Tenants' Housing Council and of Co-partnership Tenants Ltd. He also co-founded and edited the journal Labour Co-partnership.

Urban planner
Vivian set up a company called General Builders Ltd., a practical venture into co-partnership with the aim of providing its members with work and accommodation. One of Vivian's most enduring achievements was the building of the Brentham Garden Suburb in the Pitshanger area of Ealing following the philosophy of the garden city movement promoted by Ebenezer Howard. Brentham featured a social institute, library, tennis courts and a bowling green. In addition the houses were designed with large gardens and the house attracted interest from British and foreign urban planners. He was chairman on the project's management body, Ealing Tenants Ltd from its inception in 1901. Although he resigned the chairmanship in 1911, he remained on the committee until his death. At the invitation of the Governor-General, Vivian made a tour of Canada in 1910 to promote similar schemes and lecture on town planning, housing conditions, sanitation and public health. Co-Partnership Tenants Ltd went on to play an important role in the development of the garden city of Letchworth and of Hampstead Garden Suburb.

Politics

Vivian was a Free Trade Liberal not a socialist. While he did not believe in votes for women, as his support for co-partnership demonstrated, he believed in the Liberal virtues of self-reliance, self-help and freedom from state interference. He was first elected to Parliament at the 1906 general election as Lib-Lab candidate for Birkenhead, in Cheshire.  He opposed the movement of Trade Union MPs into the Labour Party in 1908. He voted against what he saw as socialist measures such as the Unemployed Workmen Bill which placed a duty on local committees to provide work or relief for the unemployed. Vivian held his Birkenhead seat at the general election of January 1910, albeit by the narrow margin of 144 votes. In December 1910 however, when he was subject to attacks from the left accusing him of being 'the workers' enemy' and urging socialists to vote against him, he lost to the Unionists.

South Somerset by-election, 1911

Vivian got a chance to re-enter the House of Commons in 1911 when the Liberal MP for South Somerset, Sir Edward Strachey, was given a peerage, causing a by-election. Vivian was adopted as Liberal candidate. South Somerset had been a Liberal seat since its creation in 1885 and Strachey had been MP for the constituency since 1892 but the size of his majorities had been decreasing since 1906 and the Conservative candidate in the by-election, Aubrey Herbert, had the advantage of being known in the area, having been the candidate in both the general elections of 1910.  The election seems to have fought mostly on the issue of the National Insurance Act. On 13 November, in a portent of things to come, the Unionists won a Liberal seat in a by-election at Oldham. Herbert entered polling day in a mood of great optimism and duly emerged as the new MP with a majority of 148 votes over Vivian.

1918–1922
Vivian had no wish to end his political career and was adopted as Liberal candidate for the new north London constituency of Edmonton in 1917. At the 1918 general election he faced a four-cornered contest there standing as an Independent Asquithian Liberal but was not successful.

He next fought Northampton at the 1922 general election again as an Independent Liberal in a three-cornered contest with a Lloyd George National Liberal and Labour. The National Liberal topped the poll and Vivian lost his deposit.

1923–1924
By the time of the 1923 general election the two wings of the Liberal Party had re-united and Vivian was chosen as candidate for Totnes in his home county of Devon. He beat the sitting Tory MP Samuel Harvey by a majority of 502 votes. However this margin was too narrow to hold against a resurgent Conservative Party at the 1924 election and Harvey regained the seat. Vivian did not stand for Parliament again but remained interested in Liberal politics as an active member of Hornsey Liberal Association.

Political and public appointments
In 1906 Vivian was appointed a member of the Royal Commission on Canals and Waterways. He was a member of the House of Commons Select Committee on Housing and Town Planning and of a Home Office Departmental Committee on Accidents in Factories and Workshops. After the First World War, Vivian became an enthusiastic supporter of the League of Nations and he was chairman of his local branch of the League of Nations Union in Hornsey.

Death
Vivian died on 30 May 1930 aged 62 years at his home, The Limes, Crouch End Hill in Hornsey.

Publications
 How Co-operative Production May be Successfully Applied to the Building Trades – Labour Association for Promoting Co-operative Production Based on the Co-partnership of the Workers (undated)
 Some Aspects of the Co-operative Movement – Labour Association for Promoting Co-operative Production Based on the Co-partnership of the Workers (undated)
 The Efficient Organisation of Industry – – Labour Association for Promoting Co-operative Production Based on the Co-partnership of the Workers (undated)
What Co-operative Production is Doing – Labour Association for Promoting Co-operative Production Based on the Co-partnership of the Workers, 1897
Partnership of Capital and Labour as a solution of the Conflict between them – Labour Association for Promoting Co-operative Production Based on the Co-partnership of the Workers, 1898
 Co-operative Stores and Labour Co-partnership – Labour Association for Promoting Co-operative Production Based on the Co-partnership of the Workers (Great Britain), 1899
Co-operative Production – Labour Co-partnership Association, 1899
Co-operation and Trade Unionism – Labour Co-partnership Association, 1902
Industrial Democracy – Labour Co-partnership Association, 1902
Co-operators and preferential tariffs – Liberal Publications Dept., London 1903
Co-partnership – The Labour Co-partnership Association, 1906
A New Chapter in the History of Co-operation and Labour: The North Wales Quarries Ltd. – Co-operative Union, Ltd., 1906
 The Pioneer Co-partnership Village – Ealing Tenants Ltd., 1908
Co-Partnership in Housing – Co-Partnership Tenants, London 1910
Problems of Finance: with special reference to the co-partnership movement – Co-partnership publishers, London 1912
Some Experiments in Community Making – Co-partnership publishers, London 1912
Co-partnership in practice – Labour Co-partnership Association, 1912
How to Apply Town Planning to Calgary – 1912

References

External links 
Brentham Society website 
 

1868 births
1930 deaths
Liberal Party (UK) MPs for English constituencies
UK MPs 1906–1910
UK MPs 1910
UK MPs 1923–1924
Liberal-Labour (UK) MPs
Trade unionists from Devon
English urban planners
People from South Hams (district)
Politics of Cheshire
Politics of Somerset
Members of the Parliament of the United Kingdom for Totnes
People from Harringay